The annual CTM Festival is a music and visual arts event held in Berlin, Germany. Founded in 1999, the festival originally focused on electronic music, but has since evolved to cover a wide range of genres under the banner "Festival for Adventurous Music and Art".

Changing through various shapes and formats over the years, the festival currently takes place as a 10-day long event in which the music program is supplemented by an extensive daytime program of workshops, art installations, panel discussions, screenings and presentations that illustrate the latest artistic, technological and economic developments in music and media cultures.

Distinguishing the festival from many others in its field is the fact that CTM spotlights music’s social role in electronic and digital culture. Through the festival, as well as various events curated by CTM throughout the year, the organization reflects the latest musical currents against a backdrop of new technologies, modern art, historical perspective, and social issues.

Festivals

CTM Berlin

CTM Siberia

Books
GENDERTRONICS – DER KÖRPER IN DER ELEKTRONISCHEN MUSIK

Edited by CTM and Meike Jansen

When, in the early 50s, electronic music appeared on the scene with the promise of abandoning all physical limits of music-making this was – like much besides – a Promethian male fantasy. Indeed, this music subsequently led to everything but disembodiment. From the psychedelic trances of the 60s and Kraftwerk robotics of the 70s, through to Techno ecstasies, gender-political interventions in the 90s and laptop performance – the questions as to how, from whom, to what ends and in which contexts electronics and the human body might be cable-linked have continually had to be addressed anew.

“Gendertronics” is an in-depth study of questions raised by last year’s festival theme, "Performing Sound", edited by CTM and Meike Jansen and published by Edition Suhrkamp Verlag. With contributions from Olaf Arndt, Claudia Basrawi, Jochen Bonz & Thomas Meinecke, Mariola Brillowska, Kurt Dahlke, Diedrich Diederichsen, Harald Fricke, Tom Holert, Miss Kittin, Pinky Rose, Birgit Richard, Terre Thaemlitz, Marc Weiser and 17 black and white drawings by Jan Rohlf. – In German language only.

See also
List of electronic music festivals
List of experimental music festivals

References

External links

DISK/CTM Festival Official Website
CTM All Artist Archive
CTM on Facebook
CTM on Twitter
DISK-CTM on Vimeo
DISK/CTM at Flickr
DISK/CTM at Last.fm
Gendertronics / Suhrkamp Publisher
I.C.A.S. / E.C.A.S. network

Music festivals established in 1999
1999 establishments in Germany
Music festivals in Berlin
Experimental music festivals
Electronic music festivals in Germany